Stagecoach Gold is a luxury bus sub-brand used by various Stagecoach bus subsidiaries in the United Kingdom.

Stagecoach Gold (originally Goldline) was launched in 2007 and was designed to attract more middle-class passengers to choose bus travel as a method of transport as well as to reward passengers on some busy and popular routes.

Stagecoach West currently runs the most Stagecoach Gold routes, nine, as of August 2022. Stagecoach South Wales owns the largest number of Stagecoach Gold branded vehicles with 76 in its fleet as of November 2019.

History

The Goldline brand was introduced to try to win more middle-class motorists to bus services. It was initially trialled in two areas, Perth and Warwick from November 2007, both on routes which received kick-start funding from the government to help establish the routes. Stagecoach East Scotland invested £300,000 to demonstrate the idea to politicians.

Goldline routes have a luxury specification. Buses have hand-stitched leather seats, metallic paint, special flooring and free WiFi. Drivers wear special uniform and there is a Goldline customer charter.

In February 2009 the service was expanded to Aldershot and in September 2009 to Cheltenham and Gloucester on route 94. At this stage the brand name changed from Goldline to Stagecoach Gold, as well as the introduction of a new livery with brighter swoops added, as opposed to the previous gold and blue only livery. The reason behind the name change was that Translink had the rights to the Goldline name, using it on their Ulsterbus coach services, and Stagecoach had to pay Translink a royalty.

In 2010, the Stagecoach Gold brand was extended to services run by Scottish Citylink, where Stagecoach have a 35% shareholding, where the Glasgow to Aberdeen and Glasgow to Inverness services were designated as Citylink Gold.

In 2015, all brand new Stagecoach Gold vehicles came equipped with USB charging facilities underneath every seat which enabled passengers to charge their mobile devices whilst on board. USB charging first became available on the Stagecoach in Oxfordshire S4 service which was upgraded to Stagecoach Gold in September 2015.

As of 2016, all brand new Stagecoach buses, including non-gold vehicles, come equipped with high back leather seats, USB charging facilities and many with free onboard Wi-Fi. Subsequently, this means that many of Stagecoach's new non-gold vehicles are now at the same specification as the Gold branded vehicles. As a result, some non-gold routes now have higher specification vehicles than many of the Gold routes as prior to 2015, Stagecoach Gold vehicles did not come equipped with USB charging facilities.

2016 also saw Stagecoach take delivery of the first Stagecoach Gold branded Alexander Dennis Enviro400 MMC and Enviro200 MMC vehicles. The liveries on the new vehicles remain the same as the previous models; however, Stagecoach have slightly modified the interior upholstery with new style leather seats that incorporate a cream-coloured headrest as well as new wood effect flooring.

Routes

As of December 2022, there are 46 Stagecoach Gold routes (including night services).

Other routes

Former routes

See also
 Arriva Max
 Arriva Sapphire

References

External links

 Stagecoach Gold website
 Stagecoach UK Bus website

Bus transport brands
Luxury brands
Stagecoach Group bus operators in England
Stagecoach Group bus operators in Scotland
2007 establishments in the United Kingdom